Atom Bomb is a 1964 Indian Malayalam-language satirical film, directed and produced by P. Subramaniam, and written by N. P. Chellappan Nair. The film stars K. Balaji, Kaviyoor Ponnamma, Adoor Bhasi and Thikkurissy Sukumaran Nair. Based on Chellappan Nair's play of the same name, it was released on 18 April 1964.

Plot

Cast 

Prem Nawas as Sudhakaran
Ragini  as Sushama
K. V. Shanthi as Kamala
K. Balaji  as Kochu Ragavan
Kaviyoor Ponnamma
Adoor Bhasi as Butlar
Thikkurissy Sukumaran Nair as Kurungodan
Adoor Pankajam as Kalyani Kutty
Aranmula Ponnamma as Janaki Amma
Kanchana
N. P. Chellappan Nair
Paravoor Bharathan
S. P. Pillai
Vanakkutty Raman Pillai

Soundtrack 
The music was composed by Br Lakshmanan, with lyrics by Thirunayinaarkurichi Madhavan Nair.

References

External links 
 

1960s Malayalam-language films
1960s satirical films
1964 films
Films directed by P. Subramaniam
Indian films based on plays
Indian satirical films
Films scored by Br Lakshmanan